Record Collection is the third studio album by music producer Mark Ronson. The album was released under the moniker Mark Ronson & The Business Intl. and was released on 27 September 2010 in the UK and on 28 September 2010 in the US.

Singles
 "Bang Bang Bang" was the first single released from the album, on 9 July 2010. The single peaked at number 6 on the UK Singles Chart, marking Ronson's fourth Top 10 hit; as well as peaking at number 18 on the Irish Singles Chart.
 "The Bike Song" was the second single released, on 17 September 2010.
 "Somebody to Love Me" was the third single released. It was to be released on 6 December 2010, however due to high interest in the single, it was moved forward to 26 November 2010.
 The title track also appeared in EA Sports game, FIFA 11.

Critical reception

Record Collection was generally well-received by critics. It holds a score of 70 on Metacritic, indicating "generally favorable reviews." The AV Club'''s Marc Hawthorne assigned the album a grade of A−, saying: "Ronson raised the bar pretty high by making the synth fantasy "Bang Bang Bang" the lead single and placing it first on the album... but there's enough big-bang boom throughout to make Record Collection feel complete." Other positive reviews came from Entertainment Weekly, who described the album as "impressively varied" and added that "Ronson’s got the production chops to hold it all together;" and AllMusic, who praised the album as "one of the best albums of [Ronson's] career." A review from Pitchfork writer Stephen M. Deusner was mixed – "It's a bit too clipped and choppy to be especially funky," he wrote, "but it does keep things fleet and agile as Ronson introduces and develops new ideas, revealing a musical curiosity that Version seemed to preclude." Other reviews, while praising guests such as Boy George and Rose Elinor Dougall, were unimpressed by Ronson's stylistic approach. Dot Music described the album as "disappointingly weak," while Uncut noted that the album's guests were the only thing that "save[s] the venture from total ignominy."

Track listing

Personnel

The Business Intl.
Mark Ronson - guitar, percussion, keyboards, drum machine, bass, bells, lead vocals on "Lose It (In the End)", co-lead vocals on "Record Collection"
Nick Movshon - bass, drums
Victor Axelrod - keyboards, percussion
Homer Steinwess - drums
Rose Elinor Dougall - keyboards, co-lead vocals on "You Gave Me Nothing", lead vocals on "Hey Boy", backing vocals on "The Night Last Night" and "Sound of Plastic"

Additional personnel
Kamaal "Q-Tip" Fareed - rapping on "Bang, Bang, Bang"
Amanda Warner - lead vocals, keyboards & programming on "Bang, Bang, Bang"
Nick Hodgson - backing vocals on "Bang, Bang, Bang"
Ghostface Killah - rapping on "Lose It (In the End)"
Thomas Brenneck - lead guitar on "Lose It (In the End)", bass on "Hey Boy"
Alex Greenwald - percussion on "Lose It (In the End)", keyboards on "Circuit Breaker" and "Record Collection", lead vocals on "The Night Last Night"
Kyle Falconer - lead vocals and bells on "The Bike Song"
Spank Rock - rapping on "The Bike Song" and "Sound of Plastic"
Boy George - lead vocals on "Somebody to Love Me"
Andrew Wyatt - backing vocals on "Somebody to Love Me", lead vocals on "You Gave Me Nothing"
D'Angelo - lead vocals on "Glass Mountain Trust"
 Teeko - turntables on "Circuit Breaker"
Pill - rapping on "Introducing the Business"
London Gay Men's Chorus - backing vocals on "Introducing the Business"
Nick Rhodes - keyboards on "Record Collection", all instruments on "Sound of Plastic"
Simon Le Bon - co-lead vocals on "Record Collection"
Wiley - rapping on "Record Collection"
Theophilus London - rapping and toasting on "Hey Boy"
Jamie Reynolds - vocals on "Sound of Plastic"
Anthony Rossomando - vocals on "Sound of Plastic"

Production credits
 All tracks produced by Mark Ronson, except "Sound of Plastic", produced by Nick Rhodes and Mark Ronson.
 Mixed by Tom Elmhirst assisted by Dan Parry at Metropolis Studios, London.
 Recorded by Thomas Brenneck and Vaughan Merrick at Dunham Studios, Brooklyn, New York except "Sound of Plastic", recorded and mixed by Joshua Blair at Sphere Studios, London.
 Additional engineering, editing and programming by Vaughan Merrick at 90 West Street, New York apart from "The Color of Crumar" (recorded by Ben Kane and D'angelo assisted by Chris Soper and mixed by Ben Kane at MSR Studios and Electric Lady Studios), "Selector" and "Missing Words" (recorded by Thomas Brenneck and Vaughan Merrick and mixed by Kennie Takahashi at Little Big Room, Los Angeles).
 Mastered by Brian Gardner at Bernie Grundman Mastering, Los Angeles.
 Executive produced by Dominic Treniere and Alex Greenwald.

Album cover
The cover, credited to art directors Gerard Saint and Mat Maitland, made reference to several famous record covers, notably Rio'' by Duran Duran (whose members, Simon Le Bon and Nick Rhodes, appeared on the album).

Charts

Weekly charts

Year-end charts

Release history

References

Mark Ronson albums
Columbia Records albums
Albums produced by Mark Ronson
2010 albums